Di Bawah Lindungan Ka'bah, or its English translation Under the Protection of Ka'Bah, may refer to:
Di Bawah Lindungan Ka'bah (novel), a novel by Hamka
Di Bawah Lindungan Ka'bah (film), a 2011 Indonesian film